Diego Pereda (1574-1634) was a Roman Catholic prelate who served as Auxiliary Bishop of Toledo (1621–1634).

Biography
Diego Pereda was born in 1574 and ordained a priest in the Oblates of Wisdom. On 17 Mar 1621, he was appointed during the papacy of Pope Gregory XV as Auxiliary Bishop of Toledo and Titular Bishop of Sidon. He was consecrated bishop on 5 Sep 1621. He served as Auxiliary Bishop of Toledo until his death in 1634. While bishop, he was the principal co-consecrator of Juan Martínez de Peralta, Bishop of Tui (1621); and Bernardino de Sena, Bishop of Viseu (1631).

References 

17th-century Roman Catholic archbishops in Spain
Bishops appointed by Pope Gregory XV
1574 births
1634 deaths